VBA may refer to:

Computing
 Visual Basic for Applications, the application edition of Microsoft's Visual Basic programming language
 VisualBoyAdvance, an emulator for the Nintendo Game Boy Advance handheld video game system

Organizations
 Vanchit Bahujan Aghadi, an Indian political party
 Veterans Benefits Administration, an organizational element of the U.S. Department of Veterans Affairs
 Veterans Benevolent Association, an early gay-interest organization founded by World War II veterans
 Vietnam Basketball Association, a professional men's basketball league in Vietnam
 Virginia Bar Association, a US voluntary organization of Virginia lawyers
 Vojnobezbednosna agencija, the Military Security Agency of Serbia